The 2014 Big 12 Conference women's soccer tournament was the postseason women's soccer tournament for the Big 12 Conference held on November 5, 7 and 9, 2014. The seven-match tournament was held at the Swope Soccer Village in Kansas City, Missouri with a combined attendance of 2,451. The 8-team single-elimination tournament consisted of three rounds based on seeding from regular season conference play. The West Virginia Mountaineers defeated the Oklahoma Sooners in the championship match to win their second conference tournament since joining the league.

Regular season standings
Source:

Bracket

Awards

Most valuable player
Source:
Offensive MVP – Ashley Lawrence – West Virginia
Defensive MVP – Kadeisha Buchanan – West Virginia

All-Tournament team

References 
2014 Big 12 Women's Soccer Tournament

 
Big 12 Conference Women's Soccer Tournament